Sand Pond may refer to: 

 Sand Pond (Maine), a pond on Hancock Brook in Denmark, Maine
 Sand Pond (New York), a small lake near French Woods, Delaware County
 Sand Pond, Rhode Island, a neighborhood and pond located north of Warwick, Rhode Island